St Andrew's Church is a congregation of the Church of Scotland in Rome, Italy, belonging to the Church's International Presbytery. Services take place every Sunday at 11:00 a.m. in Via XX Settembre, 7 00187 Rome. Rev Aaron Stevens is acting as Interim Moderator as the charge is currently vacant.

History 
The congregation began in the early 1860s with a small group of Scots and American Presbyterians who met in the neighbourhood of the Spanish Steps. A first building was opened in 1871 near the Porta Flaminia. The present building, about halfway between the Piazza della Repubblica and the Palazzo del Quirinale, was opened in early 1885.

The Italian military intelligence previously occupied the second and third floors.

Description 
Planning permission was granted only on condition that the building not from the outside look like a church, thus the architecture is similar to that of the various Italian government ministries on the same street. The building is set back a little from the street, with an enclosed forecourt, and is constructed on four levels. The church itself takes up the whole of the ground floor; above this are offices, a manse, and a broad roof terrace with views over the Vatican City.

The interior architecture of the church reflects the older Presbyterian tradition, with a central pulpit and minimal decoration. A memorial to Scottish servicemen lost in the Italian campaign has a prominent position.

See also
 Sant'Andrea degli Scozzesi
 List of Church of Scotland parishes
 All Saints' Church, Rome (Anglican)

References

External links

 

Church of Scotland churches
Protestant churches in Rome
Churches completed in 1885
19th-century Church of Scotland church buildings
Presbyterian churches in Europe
Andrew